Rida Shibli Khawaldeh (born 15 July 1962) is a Jordanian academic and politician. He was Minister of Agriculture in the government of Hani Al-Mulki between 1 June 2016 and 28 September 2016, when he left the government in a cabinet reshuffle and was replaced by Khaled Hneifat. Khawaldeh was subsequently appointed to the Senate.

Khawaldeh previously served as president of the University of Jordan at Aqaba. In April 2013 Khawaldeh was appointed as president of Mutah University per Royal Decree. Khawaldeh was one of three University presidents appointed in the government of Al-Mulki.

Khawaldeh studied plant production at the University of Jordan and obtained a BSc and MSc there. He later obtained his PhD from the University of Illinois.

References

1962 births
Living people
Agriculture ministers of Jordan
Heads of universities in Jordan
Members of the Senate of Jordan
University of Illinois Urbana-Champaign alumni
University of Jordan alumni